Princess Katharina Ursula of Hohenzollern-Hechingen (also Catherine Ursula of Hohenzollern-Hechingen) (1610 – 2 June 1640 in Baden-Baden) was the first wife of Margrave William of Baden-Baden. She married him on 13 October 1624.  She was the daughter of Johann Georg, Prince of Hohenzollern-Hechingen and his wife, Countess Franziska von Salm-Dhaun.

From her marriage, she had the following children:

Ferdinand Maximilian (23 September 1625 in Baden-Baden – 4 November 1669 in Heidelberg), Hereditary Prince of Baden-Baden
Leopold Wilhelm (16 September 1626 – 23 February 1671 in Baden-Baden), imperial field marshal
Philip Siegmund (born 25 August 1627 – died 1647, killed in battle)
William Christopher (12 October 1628 in Baden-Baden – 25 August 1652)
Hermann (12 October 1628 Baden-Baden – 2 October 1691)
Bernard (22 October 1629 – 1648 in Rome)
Francis (1637–1637)
Isabella Clara Eugenie (14 November 1630 – 1632)
Catherine Francisca Henriette (19 November 1631 – August 1691 in Besançon)
Claudia (born 15 May 1633)
Henriette (born 12 July 1634)
Anna (12 July 1634 – 31 March 1708 in Baden-Baden)
Maria (1636–1636)
Maria Juliana (1638–1638)

 

  

Margravines of Baden-Baden
House of Hohenzollern
German countesses
17th-century German people
1610 births
1640 deaths
Daughters of monarchs